Fast Ferries is a Greek ferry company operating from the Greek mainland to the Cyclades islands in the Aegean Sea.
The company was founded in 1989 by Panagiotakis Bros. and currently operates a fleet of ro-ro ferries.

Fleet
In a joint venture with Golden Star Ferries, the HSC Express high-speed craft was acquired in late 2018, expected to enter service in the summer of 2019.
However, in May 2019, the venture was dissolved and the vessel was wholly acquired by Golden Star Ferries.

As of August 2019, Fast Ferries operates the following fleet of Conventional Ferries:

High Speed Ferry

Routes

 Rafina - Cyclades:
Rafina-Andros-Tinos-Mykonos-Naxos

References

Ferry companies of Greece
Companies based in Piraeus
Transport companies established in 1989